Modern Trinidad and Tobago maintains close relations with its Caribbean neighbours and major North American and European trading partners. As the most industrialized and second-largest country in the English-speaking Caribbean, Trinidad and Tobago has taken a leading role in the Caribbean Community (CARICOM), and strongly supports CARICOM economic integration efforts. It also is active in the Summit of the Americas process and supports the establishment of the Free Trade Area of the Americas, lobbying other nations for seating the Secretariat in Port of Spain.

As a member of CARICOM, Trinidad and Tobago strongly backed efforts by the United States to bring political stability to Haiti, contributing personnel to the Multinational Force in 1994. After its 1962 independence, Trinidad and Tobago joined the United Nations and Commonwealth of Nations. In 1967, it became the first Commonwealth country to join the Organization of American States (OAS). In 1995, Trinidad played host to the inaugural meeting of the Association of Caribbean States and has become the seat of this 35-member grouping, which seeks to further economic progress and integration among its states.

In international forums, Trinidad and Tobago has defined itself as having an independent voting record, but often supports U.S. and EU positions.

Trinidad and Tobago has historically been a trans-shipment point for South American drugs destined for the United States and Europe. This has created much tension in the country's politics.

Trinidad and Tobago is also a member-state of the International Criminal Court, without a Bilateral Immunity Agreement of protection for the U.S. military (as covered under Article 98)

Trinidad and Tobago and the Commonwealth of Nations

Trinidad and Tobago became an independent state in 1962 with Queen Elizabeth II as Queen of Trinidad and Tobago. She was represented by the Governor-General of Trinidad and Tobago.

In 1976, Trinidad and Tobago became a republic in the Commonwealth of Nations with the last Governor-General, Sir Ellis Clarke becoming the first President of Trinidad and Tobago.

Bilateral relations

International organisations

On its independence in 1962, Trinidad and Tobago joined the United Nations and the Commonwealth of Nations. In 1967, it became the first Commonwealth country to join the Organization of American States (OAS).

In 1995, Trinidad played host to the inaugural meeting of the Association of Caribbean States and has become the seat of this 35-member grouping, which seeks to further economic progress and integration among its states.

As the most industrialized and second-largest country in the English-speaking Caribbean, Trinidad and Tobago has taken a leading role in the Caribbean Community (CARICOM), and strongly supports CARICOM economic integration efforts. It also is active in the Summit of the Americas process and supports the establishment of the Free Trade Area of the Americas, lobbying other nations for seating the Secretariat in Port of Spain. As a member of CARICOM, Trinidad and Tobago strongly backed efforts by the United States to bring political stability to Haiti, contributing personnel to the Multinational Force in 1994.

Trinidad and Tobago is also a member-state of the International Criminal Court, without a Bilateral Immunity Agreement of protection for the U.S. military (as covered under Article 98).

See also

List of diplomatic missions in Trinidad and Tobago
List of diplomatic missions of Trinidad and Tobago
Trinidad and Tobago passport
War on Drugs

References

External links
Ministry of Foreign Affairs

 
Trinidad and Tobago and the Commonwealth of Nations